The Department of Fuel, Shipping and Transport was an Australian government department that existed between March 1950 and May 1951.

Scope
Information about the department's functions and/or government funding allocation could be found in the Administrative Arrangements Orders, the annual Portfolio Budget Statements and in the Department's annual reports.

According to the Administrative Arrangements Order (AAO) made on 17 March 1950, the Department dealt with:
Commonwealth Oil Refineries Ltd (Government relations with)
Coal production and distribution
Importation, sale and use of liquid fuels and petroleum products, including rationing and distribution of petroleum fuels and substitute and synthetic fuels
Mining and distribution of coal
Mining and distribution of oil shale and refining of shale oil products
Oil wells. Refining and distribution of locally produced petroleum products
Control and maintenance of coastal lights and other aids to navigation on the ocean highways of the Australian coastline.
Control of navigation services such as seamen's compensation, prevention of obstruction on shipping routes and fishing grounds, accommodation for ships' crews, welfare of seamen, maintenance of ships' gear, examination of masters and officers, Courts of Marine Inquiry
Shipping, including the best utilization of the Australian Coastal Fleet, the chartering of ships, the manning of ships
Stowage and movement of explosives and dangerous cargoes at Australian ports
Policy in respect of shipbuilding and subsidy to promote the operation of Australian-built ships
Commonwealth Handling Equipment Pool
Railways, Commonwealth
Administration of Standardization of Railways Agreement
Australian Transport Advisory Council

Structure
The Department was an Australian Public Service department, staffed by officials who were responsible to the Minister for Fuel, Shipping and Transport, George McLeay The Department's secretary was C.H. McFayden.

References

Fuel, Shipping and Transport
Ministries established in 1950
1950 establishments in Australia
1951 disestablishments in Australia
Defunct transport organisations based in Australia
Shipping in Australia